The Little Choptank River is a tidal river in Dorchester County in the U.S. state of Maryland.

See also
List of Maryland rivers

References

External links
NOAA nautical chart 12266

Tributaries of the Chesapeake Bay
Rivers of Dorchester County, Maryland
Rivers of Maryland